Ludvig Henrik Ferdinand Oppermann (September 7, 1817 – August 17, 1883) was a Danish mathematician and philologist who formulated Oppermann's conjecture on the distribution of prime numbers.

Publications
From :
 1857: Bidrag til Landmaalingens Theori. (Contributions to the theory of geodesy.) Tidsskr. Krigsvaxsen, 332–44.
 1863: Under the signature "En Dilettant": En Foresp0rgsel. (A request.) Tidsskr. Math. (1) 5, p. 16.
 Under the signature "En Dilettant": Minimumsproblemer. (Minimum problems.) Tidsskr. Math. (1) 5, 17–26.
 1866: Om Livsforsikringer og Livrenter. (On life insurance and pensions.) Copenhagen, 24 pp.
 1869: Notes on Newton's formulae for interpolation. The Assurance Mag. 15, 145-8 and 177–9.
 1870: On Brigg's formula for interpolation. The Assurance Mag. 15, 312.
 On the graduation of life tables, with special application to the rate of mortality in infancy and childhood. The Assurance Rec., Febr. 11.
 1871: Om Kvadratur. (On quadrature.) Tidsskr. Math. (3) 1 11–27.
 1872: Elementaere Darstellung, der numerischen Summation und Quadratur. Copenhagen, 21 pp.
 Zur Begriindungder allgemeinenFehlertheorie(Methode der kleinsten Quadraten). Hamburg, 20 pp.

Bibliography
The Reticent Trio: Some Little-Known Early Discoveries in Life Insurance Mathematics by L.H.F. Oppermann, T.N. Thiele and J.P. Gram, Jan M. Hoem, International Statistical Review / Revue Internationale de Statistique, Vol. 51, No. 2 (Aug., 1983), pp. 213–221 
From :
 Gram, J. P. (1883). Ludvig Henrik Ferdinand Oppermann. Tidsskr. Math. (5) 1, 137–44.
 Gram, J. P. (1884). Om udjevning av Dodelighedsiagttagelser og Oppermann's Dødelighedsformel. (On smoothing mortality curves and the mortality formula of Oppermann.) Tidsskr. Math. (5) 2, 113–39.
 Sebelien, J. (1883. En grafisk Fremstelling av Forsogsrakker. (A graphical representation of observations.)
 Tidsskr. Math. (5) 1, 186–90.
 Thiele, T. N. (1890). Et stykke arvegods fra professor Oppermann. Nyt Tidsskr. Mat. 1.

References

1817 births
1883 deaths
19th-century Danish mathematicians